"Theme from Z-Cars" was the theme tune to the long-running BBC television drama Z-Cars. Based on the traditional folk song "Johnny Todd", which was in a collection of traditional tunes by Frank Kidson dated 1891 called Traditional Tunes: A Collection of Ballad Airs. Kidson's notes for this song say: "Johnny Todd is a child's rhyme and game, heard and seen played by Liverpool children. The air is somewhat pleasing, and the words appear old, though some blanks caused by the reciter's memory have had to be filled up." The song appears in the book Songs of Belfast edited by David Hammond, who heard it from a Mrs. Walker of Salisbury Avenue, Belfast, who claimed it dates from around 1900.

The Z-Cars theme tune was arranged for commercial release by Fritz Spiegl and Bridget Fry, and performed by John Keating and his Orchestra. The single reached #8 in the Record Retailer chart in April 1962, and as high as #5 in other charts. The original television theme was arranged and conducted by Norrie Paramor with his orchestra.

It was soon adopted by fans of the First Division football club Everton, who are based in Liverpool near where the programme supposedly took place. The theme tune is still played as the team come out onto the pitch at the beginning of all their home matches. They also use the theme tune on their official podcasts, used at the beginning to introduce the podcast. In 1964, Watford F.C. adopted the tune as it was then manager Bill McGarry's favourite television programme.  It has been played as the players come onto pitch since then. During the rise of the club through the leagues in the 1970s and 1980s, it became associated with the club's success under manager Graham Taylor. Sunderland A.F.C. also played the song as their players ran out to the field during their days playing at Roker Park.

References

External links
 Television Tunes recording

1962 singles
Z Cars
Songs about Liverpool
Year of song unknown
Songwriter unknown